The Edinburgh Beagles was a British ice hockey team that played in the Northern Conference of Division 2 in the British Universities Ice Hockey Association. They played their home games at Murrayfield Ice Rink in Edinburgh, Scotland and are associated with the Edinburgh Eagles (ice hockey).

History 
The Beagles were formed in 2008 by Richard 'Rambo' Gray; they are an affiliate of the Edinburgh Eagles who were formed in 2003 by Amy Slater. They are an Ice hockey club that caters primarily to university players. They accept players from any higher education institution in Scotland.

The Beagles were formed as an expansion due to the increasing numbers of less experienced players joining the Eagles.  In the first season they played only one game against the Newcastle Wildcats C team as a warm up for the Tier 3 National Championships in April.  They were first coached by their founder with the assistance of Matt Dible.  Dible is now coaching the Eagles.

2010-2011
The Beagles played their first season of BUIHA Division 3 in 2010, with a strong season, coming second. The only team able to beat them were the Nottingham Mavericks, an experienced side finished the season as Division 3 champions. 

When it came to the National Championships, the success was not quite with the Beagles. Having been abandoned by their coach Edward Baker, it was left to Matt Dible, the assistant coach for the Eagles, and Donald McCabe, who at the time was not playing for the Beagles. Despite their best efforts to organise and inspire the players, they were unable to progress beyond the group stages, achieving just two wins, two draws and a loss. All games were noted for a lack of scoring which was uncharacteristic of the Beagles' season. 

A notable event of the National Championships occurred during the final game for the Beagles, against friendly rivals the Northumbria Flames. With neither side playing for a spot in the semi-finals, it was decided that a 'fly-away' football would be put on the ice, with each team kicking it round the ice for a laugh. Meanwhile, rookie goalie Christopher Gray had a dance-off with the Flames' goalie at centre ice. After numerous video reviews and judges' meetings, it was decided Gray had won the dance-off. The game ended in a 1-1 draw.

2011-2012
In the Beagles' second season, they were far more successful than the previous year, winning every game and dominating most games. The offence got a boost with the arrival of Adam Shepherd, who racked up 20 points in 8 games, and Julian Meurer and Dan Fisher who were both point-per-game players. The defence was equally as solid, with new additions Donald McCabe and Andrew Sills providing excellent offensive options on the blue-line and Kris Madden, Francis Anderson and Courtney Andrews supplementing with great back-checking. Behind this solid defense, Christopher Gray was able to rack up three shutouts, the first time in Eagles or Beagles history that a goalie managed to achieve a shutout in a league game.

Celtic Plate 2012

The Celtic Plate was the only slight hiccup in the up-until-then perfect season which the Beagles had been enjoying. The Beagles lost 4-3 in a tight game that went down to the wire. However, the game was clean and both sides were as amicable after the game as they had been the night before.

National Championships 2012
With such a dominating season completed, the Beagles were highly touted to do well and progress to at least the semi-finals. However, despite a strong start which saw them pull a win over a controversial Warwick side, the lack of scoring threats such as Michael Mackenzie and Barbora Kohoutova meant that the games were lacking a lot of scoring. This cost them in a 2-1 loss to the Sheffield Bears, who then went on to play in the semi-finals before losing to Cardiff.

Playoffs 2012

Two weeks after the National Championships, a game was organised against the Nottingham Mavericks, who had won Division 3 South. Many within the team viewed it as a rematch and a chance to get revenge, especially those who had played in the 10-4 and 4-0 defeats to Nottingham the previous year. Both sides started strong, however it was Nottingham who managed to draw first blood, getting a 2-0 lead within the first ten minutes. The grit and determination of the team, in particular Adam Shepherd (who dislocated his shoulder three times during the game), came through, and after the first it was 2-2. It was a toughly fought contest throughout, with Nottingham making a late comeback in the game to pull it back to 5-4 with minutes remaining. However, that was as close as the Mavericks were going to get to the Beagles, who held off after a great display of defence and goaltending, before Shepherd sealed the Beagles' victory with his third goal, making it 6-4 with less than a minute to go.

2012–2013
It was decided that after such a successful season, Division 2 was the only way to go. Despite this, there were concerns as to how the Beagles would fare going from a non-checking league to a checking one, especially when the more physical players of Donald McCabe, Craig MacMorland and Julian Meurer had left after last season. However, the influx of new players meant that the physicality of the Beagles was actually increased, due to some Eagles and new players being assigned to the team and the remaining players managing to learn how to check well. The Beagles have been coping with the jump in play rather well, still scoring goals aplenty and managing to get wins over the Newcastle Wildcats.

2013–2014
The second season in Division 2 saw the Beagles finishing in third place, after Bradford Sabres and Newcastle Kings A. In the National Championship the Beagles missed out on the playoffs, after close defeats in key matches to both Sheffield Bears B and Newcastle Kings A.

2014–present
After the 2013–2014 season the decision was made not to field a team in the BUIHA Cup Competition due to a number of factors which adversely affected the organization.

Uniforms

Colors, name and logo

Home – Red, Previously Blue

Away – White, Previously Blue

Jerseys

The jerseys, since the 2013-14 season has been red and white.

The Celtic Plate 

The Beagles participate in the Celtic Plate Varsity; an annual one off challenge game against the Cardiff Redhawks B team who are the only other non-English team in the BUIHA. 

The competition has been running for 3 years, the location alternating between Murrayfield and Cardiff Bay, Cardiff. Edinburgh won the plate for the first time in 2013, beating Cardiff 4-2 to take home the Plate

Current roster

Statistics

Beagles Record

As of April 2013

Player Records

As of April 2013

Honored members

Retired numbers
22 – Amy Slater, (2003–07),  Founded the Edinburgh Eagles in 2003.
32 – Richard 'Rambo' Gray, D (2003–10), One of the founding members of the Edinburgh Eagles and Edinburgh Phoenix.  Founded and coached the first Beagles team in 2008.
43 – Ewan Heeles, (2004–10), First Eagle to get international status having played in the first British entry into Winter Universiade in Torino, Italy.
44 – Sam Granlund, D (2007–12), The stand out player of the Eagles and Phoenix during his time with the club. A great servant to the club in terms of commitment.

Future retiring numbers
23 – Cameron Thain, (2003–06), Founding member of the Eagles.  The number is now no longer worn for Eagles, but is being worn for Phoenix.  Once the number again becomes vacant it will be retired.
66 – Wajahat Khan, (2003–05), Although not worn now the number has not been officially recognized as retired.  Waj was a founder of the club.

Leaders

Team captains
Niall Balloch, 2008
Colin Stewart, 2008-2009
Michael McKenzie, 2010-2011
Donald McCabe, 2011–2012
Victor Reinerstam, 2012–present

Head coaches
Richard Gray, 2008
Edward Baker, 2008–2014

Blues and Half Blues

Blues and Half Blues are awarded by the Edinburgh University Sports Union to the University's top sportsmen and women and those who have performed to a consistently high level for their University Club. They are notoriously difficult to acquire and are only available to those at the very top of their sport. These awards are the most prestigious that can be received by an Edinburgh University athlete. To date, no member of the Edinburgh Beagles has been honored with an award of Blues or Half Blues.

External links
Edinburgh Beagles official web site
British University Ice Hockey Association official web site

Ice hockey teams in Scotland